A special election for New York's 25th congressional district was held following the death of U.S. Representative Louise Slaughter. Democrat Joseph Morelle defeated Republican Jim Maxwell on November 6, 2018.

Background
Incumbent Representative Louise Slaughter died at the age of 88 on March 16, 2018, after suffering a concussion earlier in the month.

Following precedent set in 2010, concurrent elections were held in November, one to fill the remainder of Slaughter's term, and the other to fill the seat for the next term. The district was left without Congressional representation until then.

Nominees for special elections are selected by the parties in the counties that comprise the congressional district. There are no primaries. The filing deadline for party nominations was August 30, 2018, and for independent petitions was September 4, 2018.

Democratic primary
The following information pertains to the regular election for the 25th District for a full term to the 116th Congress.

Candidates

Declared
 Adam McFadden, Rochester City Council member
 Joseph Morelle, New York State Assembly Majority Leader
 Robin Wilt, Brighton town board member 
 Rachel Barnhart, former television journalist, former Rochester mayoral candidate and founder of Rochester for All

Declined
 Robert Duffy, former lieutenant governor of New York and former mayor of Rochester (endorsed Morelle) 
 Lovely Warren, Mayor of Rochester (endorsed Morelle)
 Harry Bronson, New York State Assemblyman (endorsed Morelle)
 Adam Bello, Monroe County Clerk (endorsed Morelle)
 Cedric Alexander, Deputy Mayor of Rochester, former Police Chief
 Van White, Rochester School Board President
 Andrew Gilchrist, teacher (running for State Assembly)

Republican primary

Candidates

Declared
 Jim Maxwell, Neurosurgeon

Declined
 Joe Robach, New York State Senator
 Mark Assini, 2014 & 2016 Republican nominee, Gates Town Supervisor
 Cheryl L. Dinolfo, Monroe County Executive

General election

Results

As the winner of the special election, Morelle was sworn in on November 13 rather than waiting until the new Congressional term. He also won the regular election for a new two-year term beginning in January 2019.

References

External links
Official campaign websites

 Joe Morelle (D) for Congress
 Jim Maxwell (R) for Congress

New York 2018 25
New York 2018 25
2018 25 Special
New York 25 Special
United States House of Representatives 25 Special
United States House of Representatives 2018 25